1883 is an American Western drama television miniseries created by Taylor Sheridan that premiered on December 19, 2021, on Paramount+. The series stars Tim McGraw, Faith Hill, Sam Elliott, Isabel May, LaMonica Garrett, Marc Rissmann, Audie Rick, Eric Nelsen, and James Landry Hébert. The series is chronologically the first of several prequel series to Sheridan's Yellowstone and follows the story of how the Duttons came to own the land that would become the Yellowstone Ranch. It is also the second instalment in the franchise. The series consists of ten episodes and concluded on February 27, 2022.

Premise
The series follows the post-Civil war generation of the Dutton family as they leave Tennessee, journey to Fort Worth, Texas, and join a wagon train undertaking the arduous journey west to Oregon, before settling in Montana to establish what would eventually become the Yellowstone Ranch.

Cast and characters

Main
 Sam Elliott as Shea Brennan, an employee of the Pinkerton Agency leading the expedition. Brennan is a former captain who served in the Union Army during the American Civil War. His wife Helen and daughter both die of smallpox right before the start of the expedition. While mourning their deaths, he cremated them by setting fire to their house and contemplated suicide, but was interrupted by the arrival of Thomas. Brennan acts as the rugged and commanding leader of the wagon train, frequently reminding members of the danger and tragedy that they will face along the way.
 Tim McGraw as James Dillard Dutton. From Tennessee, he was a captain in the Confederate States Army during the Civil War and was wounded during the Battle of Antietam and captured. He was held in a Union prisoner-of-war camp for three years. A skilled leader and combatant, he joins the wagon train with his family after meeting Brennan and Thomas in Fort Worth, Texas. 
 Faith Hill as Margaret Dutton, John Dutton III's great-grandmother and the matriarch of the family. She travels via train from Tennessee with her children, sister-in-law, Claire, and niece, Mary Abel, to Fort Worth to begin a new journey with her husband, James.
 Isabel May as Elsa Dutton, James and Margaret Dutton's resourceful 17-year-old daughter. Much of the story is told in her voice as an inner narrative. Young, undisciplined and innocent, she looks forward to the expedition as a great adventure. Elsa becomes hardened during the difficult journey west, also becoming enamored with a cowboy and later a Comanche warrior; much to the dismay of her parents. However, she also becomes a skilled survivalist and cowgirl.
 LaMonica Garrett as Thomas, a Pinkerton agent and veteran U.S. Army sergeant from a Buffalo Soldier regiment. He teams up with Shea Brennan to help guide the group. His arrival helps dissuade Shea from suicide. Thomas is a skilled frontiersman, and later begins a relationship with Noemi, the Romani widow.
 Marc Rissmann as Josef, a German immigrant who is married to Risa and worked as a carpenter before travelling to America. He aids the expedition serving as an interpreter for his group and as a liaison between the Americans and immigrants.
 Audie Rick as John Dutton Sr., John Dutton III's grandfather, as a young boy. He is the younger child of James and Margaret and is five years old at the beginning of the journey.
 Eric Nelsen as Ennis, a young cowboy who is paid to escort the group and tend to their cattle. He develops a relationship with Elsa.
 James Landry Hébert as Wade, the lead cowboy.
 Noah Le Gros as Colton, an experienced cowboy who joins the group at the Texas-side of the Red River.

Recurring
 Alex Fine as Grady, an experienced cowboy and the leader of a crew of six drovers, who agrees to help an inexperienced crew round up longhorns for their long journey.
 Gratiela Brancusi as Noemi, a Romani widow who recently lost her husband and has to raise two young boys on her own. She becomes dependent on and romantically interested in Thomas, seeing him as the man who will replace her late husband as a caretaker.
 Anna Fiamora as Risa, a young immigrant woman who is married to Josef and joins the traveling camp to move west.
 Amanda Jaros as Alina, a weary but hopeful immigrant woman who speaks little English but has much resolve.
 Martin Sensmeier as Sam, a skilled Comanche warrior loyal to Quanah Parker, who later takes Elsa as his wife.
 James Jordan as Cookie, a foul-mouthed wagon train cook whose poor decision leads to the group's confrontation with a band of vengeful Lakota.

Guest stars
 Billy Bob Thornton as Marshal Jim Courtright.
 Tom Hanks as General George Meade. In a flashback to the Battle of Antietam, he consoles James Dutton after many of his fellow soldiers are killed, before the latter gets taken captive. Hanks' wife, Rita Wilson, plays Carolyn the storekeeper.
 Graham Greene as Spotted Eagle, a Crow elder who tries to help Elsa and who also points James to Paradise Valley, the final destination for the Dutton family.
 Dawn Olivieri as Claire Dutton, James Dutton's widowed sister who joins him and his family on a trip to find a new home. She is intense and stern in manner, like her daughter. She dies by suicide after losing her only surviving child, Mary Abel. She had six children before, all of whom died young.
 Emma Malouff as Mary Abel Dutton, Claire's daughter. A prim and proper young woman, she shows disdain and no sympathy for her cousin Elsa for her less traditional values. During an attack by unwelcome intruders, Mary Abel is caught in the crossfire and dies from a bullet wound.
 Rita Wilson as Carolyn, a kindly storekeeper at Doan's Crossing, at the border of Texas and Oklahoma. She befriends Margaret when the latter visits her store and they drink whiskey together. Wilson's husband, Tom Hanks, plays General Meade.
 Taylor Sheridan as Charles "Charlie" Goodnight, a rancher who hunts cattle thieves.

Episodes

Crossovers and sequels
Paramount has communicated several iterations of their plans for more episodes. In the end, none of these resulted in more episodes of 1883.

The show was initially presented as a limited series. In February 2022, Paramount announced that "additional episodes" would follow the first season. It was later announced that in place of a second season, the series would be succeeded by the sequel show 1932, later renamed 1923. Sheridan considers 1883 to be "a 10-hour movie with an ending", equivalent to a limited series.

In May 2022, Paramount revealed that the previously announced Sheridan-helmed series Bass Reeves would be a spinoff series to 1883, called 1883: The Bass Reeves Story. This longer title was later dropped.

Yellowstone crossovers
To introduce the new series 1883 to Yellowstone viewers, Tim McGraw and Faith Hill appeared as James and Margaret Dutton in flashback scenes during the fourth season of Yellowstone to show what life was like on the Dutton ranch in 1893, ten years after the Dutton family arrival in Montana. In the first episode, "Half the Money", James Dutton and his preteen sons John and Spencer, portrayed respectively by actors Jack Michael Doke and Charlie Stover, encountered starving Native Americans who had left the local reservation to bury their father on their former land that had since become a part of the Dutton Ranch. In the eighth episode No Kindness for the Coward, Margaret Dutton and her sons John and Spencer are sitting at the dinner table in their ranch homestead waiting for her husband and their father to return from a dangerous manhunt of horse thieves who plague their territory. These Yellowstone episodes aired prior to release of 1883 on Paramount+.

1923 crossovers 
A month before the premiere of 1923 in December 2022, Paramount+ released a trailer in which Elsa, voiced by Isabel May, served as the narrator. May also narrated the first episode and informed the audience about the intervening 30 years in the saga of the Duttons between 1893 (the time of flashback scenes on Yellowstone) and the start of series of 1923. Actor LaMonica Garrett served as host in the Paramount+ behind the scenes documentary 1923: Inside The Series.

Production

Development
In February 2021, Taylor Sheridan signed a five-year deal with ViacomCBS and MTV Entertainment Group following the success of Yellowstone. Under the deal, he would create new series for both studios. One of these was a prequel to Yellowstone, set to be broadcast on Paramount+, initially called Y: 1883. Sheridan said that he struggled with writer's block after selling the concept to Paramount+, but he managed to overcome it. While working on another series, Mayor of Kingstown, Sheridan noticed Isabel May auditioning for a role on that show. Focusing on the perspective of "what would happen if someone like May left polite society behind" Sheridan completed the 1883 pilot script in a week.

Casting
Sheridan went on to make Paramount hire May, a relative unknown, before he was even finished writing the script, because "it won't work if we don't get her." As he explained in a December 2022 interview; "When you find talents like Isabel [May], you just want to work with them again, and again, and again, and again."

On August 4, 2021, it was announced that Tim McGraw, Faith Hill and Sam Elliott had joined the cast. A further announcement on August 21 confirmed Isabel May and announced that LaMonica Garrett had joined the cast. On September 10, December 6, and December 10, respectively, it was confirmed that Billy Bob Thornton, Graham Greene, and Tom Hanks had joined as guest stars.

Filming
Filming on the series started in August 2021 in Texas and concluded in Montana in January 2022.

Scenes that took place in urban centers were filmed in Dallas, Texas, Fort Worth, Texas and Granbury, Texas. Also, a new, permanent, Western town with 26 structures was built at the Yellowstone Film Ranch. Rural scenes were filmed at a variety of locations, primarily in Texas. The Dutton Ranch scenes were filmed at the real Chief Joseph Ranch in Darby, Montana; the massive home is also used for the series "Yellowstone".

Many of the actors expressed discomfort at the cold temperatures while filming in Montana. Star Faith Hill deemed filming as "the most physically and mentally challenging thing we have ever done." Star Sam Elliott also expressed that filming his scenes was difficult, but "we're getting it onscreen, and in the end that's what matters. This is really going to be something special."

Isabel May discussed Taylor Sheridan's quest for "authenticity" concerning no cosmetics nor shaving of underarm hair. In Town & Country, May emphasized, "Taylor said from the very beginning, 'I want everything to be authentic.' I mean, women didn't start shaving until the 1920s. He really wanted that to be an aspect of the show, and so I was more than happy to oblige."

Music
The series's score was composed by Brian Tyler and Breton Vivian, both of whom worked on Yellowstone.

Release
On November 8, 2021, a first-look trailer for the series was released; a full trailer was released on December 3. The series made its TV premiere on December 25, 2021, on CMT. The first episode was run on Paramount Network, who ordered the show before they moved it to streaming on affiliated platform Paramount+ during its development, as part of promoting the show, like they did with Mayor of Kingstown. The series was released on Blu-ray and DVD under the title 1883: A Yellowstone Origin Story on August 30, 2022.

Reception 

Review aggregator Rotten Tomatoes reported an approval rating of 89% based on 27 reviews with an average score of 7.5/10. The website's critics consensus reads, "1883 can feel too overdetermined to be a properly rough-hewn Western, but viewers will want to saddle up for Sam Elliott's commanding star turn." Metacritic gave the series a weighted average score of 69 out of 100 based on 12 critic reviews, indicating "generally favorable reviews".

Accolades

Footnotes

References

External links
 
 

English-language television shows
2020s American drama television series
2020s Western (genre) television series
2021 American television series debuts
2022 American television series endings
American prequel television series
Fiction set in 1883
Paramount+ original programming
Television series about families
Television series created by Taylor Sheridan
Television series set in the 1880s
Television shows filmed in Montana
Television shows filmed in Texas
Television shows set in Montana
Television shows set in Fort Worth, Texas